The Alpine Stake Tabernacle or Alpine Tabernacle, located at 110 East Main Street (US-89) in American Fork, Utah, United States, functions as a meeting place for large gatherings of members of the Church of Jesus Christ of Latter-day Saints in northern Utah County for worship services.  The building is part of the American Fork Historic District listed on the National Register of Historic Places.

Construction
Plans for the tabernacle began soon after the formation of the Alpine Stake and drawings were made by the architectural design firm Liljenberg & Maeser.  Construction on the foundation began in 1909 and the cornerstone was dedicated in 1910 by Orson F. Whitney. The structure was completed in 1914 at a cost of $80,000 and dedicated the following year in 1915 by LDS Church President Joseph F. Smith.  The exterior is built with stone, red sandstone and yellow brick and does not feature a tower or steeple.  The interior seats about 2,000 and retains much original decoration. Like many LDS tabernacles, it houses a grand pipe organ.  It also was built with a baptismal font.  The tabernacle was extensively remodeled at a cost of $230,000 in 1962 and rededicated by Henry D. Moyle.  It was remodeled again in 1982. In 1994, the tabernacle was closed for a period of time while renovations were undertaken, including an extensive asbestos abatement. The tabernacle was reopened in 1995 and continues to function as a tabernacle and hold various civic meetings.

See also

 National Register of Historic Places listings in Utah County, Utah

References

External links

Churches completed in 1914
20th-century Latter Day Saint church buildings
Religious buildings and structures in Utah County, Utah
Tabernacles (LDS Church) in Utah
Buildings and structures in American Fork, Utah
Historic district contributing properties in Utah
Churches on the National Register of Historic Places in Utah